Time Slips Away is an album by Champion. It contains their two EPs, Count Our Numbers and Come Out Swinging. It was released in 2005 on Bridge 9 Records.

Track list

References

Champion (band) compilation albums
2005 compilation albums
Bridge 9 Records compilation albums